Kefalari (Greek: Κεφαλάρι) may refer to several places in Greece:

Kefalari, Attica, a subdivision of the municipality of Kifisia in suburban Athens
Kefalari, Argolis
Kefalari, Corinthia, a village in Corinthia 
Kefalari, Kastoria